Patrick Mäder (born 27 February 1965) is a retired Swiss football goalkeeper.

References

1965 births
Living people
Swiss men's footballers
FC Baden players
FC Zürich players
FC Winterthur players
Association football goalkeepers
Swiss Super League players
People from Schaffhausen
Sportspeople from the canton of Schaffhausen